Loris Frasnelli (born 22 February 1979) is an Italian cross country skier who has competed since 1998. His lone World Cup victory was in a team sprint event in Japan in 2006.

Competing in two Winter Olympics, he earned his best finish of sixth in the individual sprint event at Turin in 2006.

His best finish at the FIS Nordic World Ski Championships was 23rd in the individual sprint event at Sapporo in 2007.

Cross-country skiing results

Olympic Games

World Championships

World Cup

Team podiums
 1 victory – (1 )
 2 podiums – (2 )

References

External links

1979 births
Cross-country skiers at the 2006 Winter Olympics
Cross-country skiers at the 2010 Winter Olympics
Italian male cross-country skiers
Living people
Olympic cross-country skiers of Italy
Universiade medalists in cross-country skiing
Universiade bronze medalists for Italy
Competitors at the 2003 Winter Universiade